This is a list of television programs currently rerunning and formerly on Cartoon Network Asia since it was launched on October 6, 1994.

Current Programming

Cartoon Network Originals

Acquired programming
50/50 Heroes
Grizzy and the Lemmings
Kaeloo
Mechamato
Maca & Roni (shorts)
Mr. Bean: The Animated Series
Power Rangers (exclusive to Cartoon Network Philippines)
Talking Tom & Friends (hiatus)
Tobot: Galaxy Detectives (exclusive to Cartoon Network Philippines)

Cartoonito programming (Philippines only)
Baby Looney Tunes
Batwheels
Dino Ranch
Lucas The Spider
Monchhichi Tribe
Mumfie
Ranger Rob

Former Programming

Original Programming from Cartoon Network Studios 

Apple & Onion (25 January 2019 – 1 July 2022)
Ben 10 (2005)
Ben 10: Alien Force
Ben 10: Omniverse
Ben 10: Ultimate Alien
Camp Lazlo
Chowder (6 April 2009 – 1 July 2022)
Clarence (5 January 2015 – 1 January 2022)
Class of 3000
Codename: Kids Next Door
Courage the Cowardly Dog
Cow and Chicken
Dexter's Laboratory
Ed, Edd n Eddy
Foster's Home for Imaginary Friends (moved to Boomerang)
Generator Rex
Grim & Evil
Hi Hi Puffy AmiYumi
I Am Weasel
Johnny Bravo
Mao Mao: Heroes of Pure Heart (14 December 2019 – August 2021)
Megas XLR
Mighty Magiswords (13 March 2017 – 1 January 2022)
Mike, Lu & Og
Mixels
My Gym Partner's a Monkey
OK K.O.! Let's Be Heroes (20 January 2018 – 1 January 2022)
Over the Garden Wall
Samurai Jack
Sheep in the Big City
Steven Universe Future (2020–2021)
Squirrel Boy
The Fungies! (14 November 2020 – 2022)
The Grim Adventures of Billy & Mandy
The Life and Times of Juniper Lee
The Marvelous Misadventures of Flapjack
The Powerpuff Girls (1998) (moved to Boomerang)
Time Squad
Uncle Grandpa (5 May 2014 – 1 January 2022)
Victor & Valentino (25 August 2019 – 14 September 2022)
What A Cartoon!

Original Programming from Hanna-Barbera Studios Europe 
Elliott from Earth (2021)

Original Programming from Warner Bros. Animation 

2 Stupid Dogs
The 13 Ghosts of Scooby-Doo
A Pup Named Scooby-Doo
The Addams Family
The All New Popeye Show
The Batman
Batman: The Brave and the Bold
Be Cool, Scooby-Doo!
Cattanooga Cats
Duck Dodgers
DC Super Hero Girls (16 November 2019 – 28 October 2022)
Fantastic Four
Fantastic Max
Fish Police
The Flintstone Kids
The Flintstones
Godzilla
Harry Potter: Hogwarts Tournament of Houses (2022)
Hong Kong Phooey
Jabberjaw
The Jetsons
Jonny Quest
Josie & the Pussycats
Justice League Action
Justice League Unlimited
Justice League
Krypto the Superdog
Looney Tunes
The Mask
Monchhichis
Mucha Lucha!
New Looney Tunes
Ozzy & Drix
Paddington Bear
The Perils of Penelope Pitstop
Richie Rich
The Road Runner Show
Scooby-Doo and Guess Who?
Scooby-Doo! Mystery Incorporated
Scooby-Doo and Scrappy-Doo (1979)
Scooby-Doo and Scrappy-Doo (1980)
Scooby-Doo, Where Are You?
Snooper and Blabber
Speed Buggy
Squiddly Diddly
Static Shock
Superman: The Animated Series
Swat Kats
Teen Titans
The Tom and Jerry Show (1975)
The New Scooby-Doo Movies
The New Scooby-Doo Mysteries
The New Shmoo
The Pirates of Dark Water
The Zeta Project
ThunderCats Roar (2020–2021)
Tom and Jerry
Tom and Jerry in New York (6 December 2021 – 29 December 2022)
Tom & Jerry Kids
Tom and Jerry Tales
Top Cat
Unikitty! (2018–2021)
Wally Gator
What's New, Scooby-Doo?
Xiaolin Showdown
Yogi's Treasure Hunt

Original Programming from Adult Swim (Philippines only)
Aqua Teen Hunger Force
Harvey Birdman, Attorney at Law
Sealab 2021
Space Ghost Coast-to-Coast
The Brak Show

Acquired Programming 

ABC Monsters
The Adventures of Hello Kitty & Friends (exclusive to Cartoon Network Philippines)
The Adventures of Tintin (exclusive to Cartoon Network Philippines)
 Animal Control!
Atomic Betty
Barbie Dreamhouse Adventures
Beat Monsters
Beyblade (exclusive to Cartoon Network Philippines)
Big Bag
Bill & Tony
Boy Girl Dog Cat Mouse Cheese
Buck & Buddy (shorts)
Captain Planet and the Planeteers
Casper & The Angels
Centurions
Chop Socky Chooks
Coconut Fred's Fruit Salad Island
Code Lyoko 
Chaplin & Co
Crocadoo 
Cloudy With A Chance Of Meatballs
Cha-Ching
Detective Squad
Dink the Little Dinosaur
Dragon Ball Z Kai
DreamWorks Dragons
 The Dukes Of Broxstonia
Exchange Student Zero (moved to Boomerang)
 Fish N Chips
Future Card Buddyfight Ace (exclusive to Cartoon Network Philippines)
The Garfield Show
Journey of Long (moved to Boomerang)
He-Man and the Masters of the Universe
Horrid Henry 
Jimmy Two-Shoes
Johnny Test
Journey of Long
The Jungle Bunch (exclusive to Cartoon Network Philippines)
Kingdom Force (moved to Boomerang)
Lego Monkie Kid
The Little Lulu Show
Mission Hill (exclusive to Cartoon Network Philippines)
Monster Beach (2020–2021) (moved to Boomerang)
Mr. Magoo
My Dad the Rock Star
 Mega Bites 
Mirmo! (exclusive to Cartoon Network Philippines)
Mojacko
My Little Pony: Pony Life
My Melody (exclusive to Cartoon Network Philippines)
Naruto
Ninjago
Oggy and the Cockroaches (late 2011 - August 31, 2021)
Pet Alien
Popeye Cartoons
The Popeye Show
Power Players (2020–2021)
Pink Panther and Pals
Pokémon (moved to Disney Channel)
Powerpuff Girls Z
Princess Sara 
Robotboy
Rat-A-Tat
Ninja Express (moved to Boomerang)
Rocky and Bullwinkle
Running Man Animation
Ryukendo (exclusive to Cartoon Network Philippines)
Small World
The Smurfs
Snack World
Sonic Boom
Speed Racer (exclusive to Cartoon Network Philippines)
Stars Align
Supernoobs
Super Shiro
Shaun the Sheep
Talking Tom Heroes (moved to Boomerang)
The Wacky World of Tex Avery
The Mr. Men Show (Australian Dub) (25th February 2008-3rd September 2017)
The Simpsons (exclusive to Cartoon Network Philippines)
Thomas & Friends (exclusive to Cartoon Network Philippines)
ThunderCats (1985)
Time Bokan 24
Time Warp Trio
Timeless Tales
Total Drama
Total DramaRama (2020–2022)
Transformers: Cyberverse
True and the Rainbow Kingdom (exclusive to Cartoon Network Philippines)
Where on Earth Is Carmen Sandiego?
Winx Club (moved to Nickelodeon)
The Woody Woodpecker Show (exclusive to Cartoon Network Philippines)
 Wallace and Gromit's Cracking Contraptions
X-Men: Evolution
Yo-Kai Watch
Yu-Gi-Oh! (exclusive to Cartoon Network Philippines)
Zoids: Chaotic Century (exclusive to Cartoon Network Philippines)
Zoids: Fuzors (exclusive to Cartoon Network Philippines)
Zoids Genesis (exclusive to Cartoon Network Philippines)
Zoids Wild (exclusive to Cartoon Network Philippines)

Notes

References

Cartoon Network-related lists